The Collegium Canisianum or simply Canisianum in Innsbruck, Austria, is an international School of Theology for priests' of the Roman Catholic church run by the Jesuits.

History
The Canisianum is one of many Jesuit seminaries worldwide named after Saint Peter Canisius and was built in 1910–1911 under Rector, or Regens, Michael Hofmann, to replace the previous Nicolaihaus seminary, which had been outgrown.

During World War I it also accommodated from 1915 to 1919 the students of the Collegium Germanicum in Rome.

On 21 November 1938 it was shut down by the National Socialists. The theology Faculty relocated to Sitten, Switzerland until they were able to return to Innsbruck in October 1945. In 2007 the Canisianum changed from a seminary to an International School of Theology, for ordained priests pursuing advanced studies at the University of Innsbruck.

Renovations were completed on the 100 year old building in 2022.

Notable alumni
 Blessed Vilmos Apor (1892–1945), bishop of the diocese of Győr, beatified in 1997
 Blessed Nykyta Budka (1877–1959), auxiliary bishop of Lviv (Lwów), beatified in 2001
 Petar Čule (1898–1985), bishop of Mostar-Duvno and apostolic administrator of Trebinje-Mrkan
 Josef Frings (1887–1978), Archbishop of Cologne, cardinal
 Blessed Clemens August Graf von Galen (1878–1946), bishop of Münster, cardinal, beatified 2005
 Wilhelm Imkamp (b. 1951), German Catholic prelate
 Blessed Andrew Ishchak (1887–1941), professor at the theological academy in Lwów, beatified in 2001
 Myroslav Ivan Lubachivsky (1914–2000), Cardinal, archbishop of Lviv of the Ukrainian Catholic Church
 Konrad Graf von Preysing (1880–1950), bishop of Berlin, cardinal
  Paulus Rusch (1903–1986), bishop of Innsbruck
 Adam Stefan Sapieha (1867–1951), cardinal archbishop of Kraków, cardinal
 Joseph Slipyj (1892–1984), Metropolitan of the Ukrainian Catholic church, cardinal
 Reinhold Stecher (b. 1921), bishop of Innsbruck
 Blessed Clement Sheptytsky (1869–1951), Exarch of Russia and Siberia, Archimandrite of the Studite monks, beatified 2001
 Bruno Wechner (1908–1999), first bishop of Feldkirch
 Henry J. Grimmelsman  (1890–1972), first bishop of Evansville, Indiana and a principal author of The Holy Bible, New Testament, Challoner-Rheims Version, Confraternity of Christian Doctrine Revision

See also
 List of Jesuit sites

References

External links
Canisianum Website

Catholic seminaries
Buildings and structures in Tyrol (state)
Educational institutions established in 1910
Seminaries and theological colleges in Austria
Education in Tyrol (state)
1910 establishments in Austria-Hungary